James H. "Dewey" McDougal (September 19, 1871 – April 28, 1935), was a professional baseball player who was a pitcher in the Major Leagues from – for the  St. Louis Browns.

McDougal was born in Aledo, Illinois and died in Galesburg, Illinois.

External links

1871 births
1935 deaths
Major League Baseball pitchers
St. Louis Browns (NL) players
19th-century baseball players
Quincy Ravens players
Wheeling Mountaineers players
Quincy Browns players
Cedar Rapids Rabbits players
Baseball players from Illinois